Charles Trowbridge Haubiel (born Delta, Ohio, January 30, 1892 - died Los Angeles, August 26, 1978) was an American composer. He toured as a pianist and a lecturer. He composed three operas in addition to much orchestral and chamber music. His music has been described as a combination of Johannes Brahms and Claude Debussy.

Early life
Having first studied piano under his sister, Florence Pratt Morey, he, at the age of sixteen, continued his music instruction in Berlin with Martin Krause and Rudolph Ganz. Later, in New York City, he studied piano under Josef and Rosina Lhévinne, counterpoint with Rosario Scalero, and orchestration with Modest Altschuler.

In New York City, from 1921 to 1931, he taught piano at the Institute of Musical Art, now known as Juilliard, and at New York University from 1923 to 1947.

In 1935, he organized The Composers' Press in order to promote the works of contemporary American composers.

Compositions
During World War I, he was stationed in Paris, where he composed his Portraits for solo piano in 1919. The three movements were musical portraits of his friends Lee Pattison, Guy Maier, and Edwin Sauter. An orchestral version of the piece, under the title Tre Ritratti Characteristici, won the Swift Symphonic Contest in 1935, and was subsequently premiered by Frederick Stock and the Chicago Symphony Orchestra.

His set of variations for orchestra, Karma, won first prize in the 1928 International Columbia Graphophone Competition.

References

Haubiel's papers at WSU Libraries

Specific

American male composers
New York University faculty
1892 births
1978 deaths
20th-century American composers
20th-century American male musicians